Jared Newberry (born April 11, 1981) is an American football linebacker in the All American Football League for Team Alabama.  He also played in the National Football League for the Washington Redskins, San Francisco 49ers, and the New York Jets.  He played college football at Stanford University and was drafted in the 2005 NFL Draft.

High school years
While attending DeLaSalle High School (Minneapolis, Minnesota), Newberry starred in football, track and basketball.  In football, he was a three-time All-Conference selection and as a senior, was also a team captain.  In basketball, he led his team to a state championship as a junior.  In track, he excelled in shot put and discus.

Pro career
Drafted by the Washington Redskins, Jared would go on to play both in the NFL and in NFL Europe.

Professionally
Once he retired, Newberry would enroll at Howard University in the business school (2011-2012) and graduate into a position in investment banking with Wells Fargo.

References 

1981 births
Living people
American football linebackers
Stanford Cardinal football players
Washington Redskins players
San Francisco 49ers players
New York Jets players